Harutaea flavizona is a moth of the family Geometridae. It is found in Taiwan, Thailand and Indonesia.

References

Moths described in 2000
Boarmiini